Jiske Griffioen and Aniek van Koot defeated the three-time defending champion Yui Kamiji and her partner Diede de Groot in the final, 6–3, 6–2 to win the women's doubles wheelchair tennis title at the 2017 Australian Open.

Marjolein Buis and Kamiji were the defending champions, but did not play together. Buis partnered Lucy Shuker, but was defeated in the semifinals by Griffioen and van Koot.

Seeds

Draw

References
Draw 

Wheelchair Women's Doubles
2017 Women's Doubles